Bárbara Dührkop Dührkop (born 27 July 1945, in Hanover) is a Spanish politician and member of the Spanish Socialist Workers' Party (PSOE). She was until 2009 a Member of the European Parliament, where she was a vice-chair of the Socialist Group and sat on the European Parliament's Committee on Budgets, as well as being a substitute on the Committee on Agriculture and Rural Development and the Committee on Budgetary Control.

Her husband Enrique Casas was assassinated by the Comandos Autónomos Anticapitalistas (CAA) in 1984.

Education
 1971: Graduate in humanities of the University of Uppsala (Sweden)
 1973: Language teacher in Hamburg

Career
 1974-1978: Lecturer at the University of Erlangen–Nuremberg
 1978-1987: Language teacher at the Usandizaga Institute and the German School (San Sebastián)
 1995: Chair of the Board of the German School in San Sebastian
 1999: Member of the executive committee of the Socialist Party of Euskadi - Euskadiko Ezkerra
 since 1987: Member of the European Parliament
 1989-1994: Socialist coordinator on the Committee on Culture and Education
 1994-1999: Vice-chairwoman of the Committee on Budgets
 1995: Awarded the Mujer Progresista prize

Decorations
 Grand Cross of the Order of Civil Merit of the Republic of Austria

See also
2004 European Parliament election in Spain

References

External links
 
 

1945 births
Living people
Politicians from Hanover
Uppsala University alumni
MEPs for Spain 1987–1989
MEPs for Spain 1989–1994
MEPs for Spain 1994–1999
MEPs for Spain 1999–2004
MEPs for Spain 2004–2009
20th-century women MEPs for Spain
21st-century women MEPs for Spain
Spanish people of German descent
Spanish Socialist Workers' Party MEPs